Kalasi Jatra or Kailasi Jatra is a Hindu festival observed in the Boudh, Subarnapur and Balangir district of Kosal region of Odisha, India.  This festival is celebrated on the holy month of Kartika. During this festival the goddess is taken out from the worshiping centre to outside in a big musical procession. The devotees pray the goddess and the celebration takes place until late night. It is considered a festival of tribal origin and emphasizes the fact that the Kosal region is known for its Shakti and tantric culture.

See also
 Pushpuni
 Jiuntia
 Dhanu Jatra
 Kosaleswara temple
 Kosal
 Kosal State Movement
 Kosalananda Kavya
 Cultural Profile of South Kosal

References

External links
Festivals of Boudh District

Boudh district
Subarnapur district
Balangir district
Festivals in Odisha
October observances
November observances